The grey friarbird (Philemon kisserensis) is a species of bird in the family Meliphagidae. It is endemic to the southern Moluccas: Kisar, Leti and Moa islands.

References

grey friarbird
Birds of the Maluku Islands
grey friarbird